PBX/Knotted 1 Homeobox 1 (PKNOX1) is a protein that in humans is encoded by the PKNOX1 gene.

An important paralog of this gene is PKNOX2.

Function 
PKNOX1 belongs to the three amino acid loop extension (TALE) class of homeodomain transcription factors that form transcriptionally active complexes involved in development and organogenesis. PKNOX1 is essential for embryogenesis, but it can also act as a tumor suppressor in adulthood.

References

Further reading

External links 
 

Transcription factors